Thaddeus Mason Harris (July 7, 1768– April 3, 1842) was a Harvard librarian, Unitarian minister and author in the early 19th Century.  His most noted book was The Natural History of the Bible first published in Boston in 1793.

Harris was named after his maternal grandfather Thaddeus Mason, Harvard University class of 1728 and secretary to Jonathan Belcher. His father William Harris was killed fighting on the colonists' side in the American Revolutionary War. Harris was born in Charlestown, Massachusetts, but after his father's death he was sent to live on a farm in Sterling, Massachusetts.  Harris went on to study at Harvard from which he graduated in 1787.  After graduation from Harvard, he spent a year as a school teacher in Worcester, Massachusetts.  At the end of his teaching stint in Worcester, Harris was offered an appointment as secretary to George Washington, but contracted small-pox, and his recovery time prevented him from taking the post. He became the librarian of Harvard in 1791 and then was appointed the minister of the First Unitarian Church on Meeting House Hill in Dorchester, Massachusetts, in 1793. He was elected a Fellow of the American Academy of Arts and Sciences in 1806.  Harris was also a founding member of the American Antiquarian Society in 1812, and served as corresponding secretary from 1812-1831, and as secretary of foreign correspondence from 1831-1832. The Antiquarian Society holds original copies of a significant number of Harris's published works, as well as some manuscript items from his personal papers.

Harris's son Thaddeus William Harris would also serve as a librarian at Harvard and be one of the leading American naturalists in the first half of the 19th century.

Works 
His publications include:

 Journal of a Tour into the Territory Northwest of the Alleghany Mountains (1805)
 The Natural History of the Bible (1820)
 Biographical Memorials of James Oglethorpe (1841)

References

Further reading

External links
 
 

1768 births
Fellows of the American Academy of Arts and Sciences
Members of the American Antiquarian Society
Harvard University librarians
Harvard University alumni
1842 deaths